Gever may refer to:

 Yüksekova (Kurdish: Gever), a city and district of Hakkari Province, Turkey
 Gever, Netherlands, a hamlet in the Dutch province of North Brabant

See also

Geber (disambiguation)
Gevers, a surname